Alphonsea monogyna is a species of plant in the Annonaceae family. It is endemic to China.

References

monogyna
Endemic flora of China
Vulnerable plants
Taxonomy articles created by Polbot